Rade Radovanović (20 December 1928 – 11 July 2021) was a Yugoslav athlete. He competed in the men's triple jump at the 1952 Summer Olympics.

References

External links

1928 births
2021 deaths
Athletes (track and field) at the 1952 Summer Olympics
Yugoslav male triple jumpers
Montenegrin male athletes
Olympic athletes of Yugoslavia
Sportspeople from Podgorica